Yekaterina Alexandrovna Ankinovich (1911-1991) was a Soviet geologist and mineralogist, Doctor of Sciences and professor. She discovered a record number of minerals - 12. She won the Lenin Prize and the Stalin Prize.

Biography

Early life
Ankinovich was born in Little Yalchik (now Chuvashia).

Education
In 1937, she graduated from Leningrad Mining Institute (now Saint Petersburg Mining University). 
In 1964, she earned a Doctor of Sciences in Geology and Mineralogy.

Career
She worked in the geological service of Kazakhstan including in Alma-Ata and Karatau.

Ankinovich became a professor in 1967. She later became head of the department of "crystallography, mineralogy and petrography."

Awards
Stalin Prize Third Degree (USSR State Prize) 1948 for "geological research and development of the Nikolaevsky polymetal deposit"
Medal "For Valiant Labour in the Great Patriotic War 1941–1945"
Honored Scientist of the Kazakhstani SSR (1974)
USSR Deposit Discoverer Medal
Lenin Prize

Honors
She has a mineral named after her - Ankinovichit.

Family life
Her husband Stepan Gerasimovich Ankinovich was also a Soviet geologist.

References

1911 births
1991 deaths
Soviet geologists
Women geologists
Stalin Prize winners
Saint Petersburg Mining University alumni